UTX may refer to:

 United Technologies Corporation, an American multinational conglomerate based in Hartford, Connecticut.
 Universal Terminology eXchange, a set of formats for machine translation user dictionaries.
 Ubiquitously transcribed tetratricopeptide repeat, X chromosome, a human gene.